Ek Tha Raja is a 1996 Indian Hindi-language film directed by Dayal Nihalani. It stars Aditya Pancholi, Sunil Shetty, Saif Ali Khan, Neelam, Pratibha Sinha, Indrani Banerjee in lead roles, with Kader Khan, Aruna Irani, Shakti Kapoor, Aloknath, Mohan Joshi, Avtar Gill in other supporting roles.

Synopsis

Lalchand Dogra lives in a palatial house with his wife, Anjana, and three sons, Sunny, Raj, and Jay. Due to circumstances beyond their control, all get separated, with Lalchand himself ending up serving time in prison for several years. Years later, Lalchand is released from jail and sets out to find his family and try to put the rest of his life together. What he does not know that Jay has been adopted by the Commissioner of Police, Paramjeet Singh, and is currently looking at ways to get Lalchand back in prison; Sunny has been hired as his bodyguard; and Raj has just received a contract to kill Lalchand at any cost. It looks like the Dogra family is headed for another separation - this time permanent. But, later the Dogra family gets reunited.

Cast
 Aditya Pancholi as Raj
 Sunil Shetty as Jay
 Saif Ali Khan as Sunny
 Neelam as Shilpa
 Pratibha Sinha as Kitty
 Indrani Banerjee as Jyoti
 Kader Khan as Lalchand Dogra
 Aruna Irani as Anjana Dogra
 Shakti Kapoor as Lakhpat
 Aloknath as Police Commissioner Paramjeet Singh
 Mohan Joshi as Baba
 Avtar Gill as Iqbal
 Shiva Rindani as Chhote
 Rana Jung Bahadur as Minister

Soundtrack

The music was composed by Anand–Milind and the lyrics were penned by Sameer.

References

External links

1990s Hindi-language films
1996 films
Films scored by Anand–Milind